The Halifax Busker Festival is an annual event held by Premier Entertainment Group in Halifax, Nova Scotia on the Halifax Waterfront showcasing talent from buskers around the world. The festival runs for 6 days during the Natal Day long weekend in July and August. The festival was founded in 1986 as Halifax Busker Festival. Admission to the festival is free but audience members are encouraged to tip performers. The official website for the festival allows people to tip performers via an online link. In 2020 the event was held entirely online due to the COVID-19 pandemic. The festival was cancelled in 2021 due to the ongoing pandemic, replaced instead by in-person performances by local musicians and magicians.

References

External links 
 Official website
 Twitter page
 Facebook page
 Information from Tourism Nova Scotia

Festivals in Halifax, Nova Scotia